Zhuhai (Yale: Jyūhói), also known as Chuhai is a prefecture-level city located on the west bank of Pearl River estuary on the central coast of southern Guangdong province, People's Republic of China, on the southeastern edge of Pearl River Delta.  Its name literally means "pearl sea", which originates from the city's location at the mouth of the Pearl River meeting the South China Sea.  Zhuhai borders Jiangmen to the west, Zhongshan to the north and Macau to the southeast, and shares maritime boundaries with Shenzhen and Hong Kong to the northeast across the estuary.

Zhuhai was one of the original four Special Economic Zones established in 1980, as well as one of China's premier tourist destinations, being called the Chinese Riviera. While the city is located in the traditionally Cantonese-speaking province of Guangdong, a significant portion of the population is now made up of Mandarin-speaking economic migrants originally from inland provinces.

The core of Zhuhai, Xiangzhou District along with Macao, in the northeastern portion of the administrative division, are part of the Guangdong-Hong Kong-Macau Greater Bay Area, the biggest built-up area in the world with more than 65,565,622 inhabitants as of the 2020 census, encompassing Shenzhen, Dongguan, Foshan, Zhongshan, Macau, the main part of Guangzhou, and small parts of Jiangmen and Huizhou cities but with Hong Kong not quite conurbated yet.

According to a report released in 2014 by the Chinese Academy of Social Sciences, Zhuhai is the most livable city in China. Zhuhai is classified as a Medium-Port Metropolis.

Geography 

Its territory has  of coastline and 217 islands, of which 147 are over 500 square metres in area.

The islands within the prefecture-level city of Zhuhai include a number of near-shore islands, often connected to the mainland by bridges or causeways (such as Hengqin, Qi'ao, or Yeli Islands), as well as some islands in the open South China Sea (the Wanshan Archipelago). Some of the latter are actually geographically closer to Hong Kong than to the Zhuhai mainland. The jurisdiction of Nei Lingding Island, located in the Pearl River estuary was transferred from Zhuhai to Shenzhen in 2009.

Climate
Despite being located within the tropics, Zhuhai has a humid subtropical climate affected by the East Asian Monsoon (Koppen classification Cwa) and moderated by the South China Sea, with long, hot and humid summers with frequent thunderstorms, and short, mild and dry winters. Average highs in January and July are  respectively. Snowfalls are unknown and a frost has never been recorded in the city centre. Conversely, extreme heat waves do not occur as they do further inland. Being named one of the most liveable cities in China, real estate is robust here. Residents from the mainland, especially those from the North, will buy homes and spend their winters in Zhuhai.

Economy 

Zhuhai became a city in 1979, a year before it was designated as one of the first Special Economic Zones of China (SEZ). Similarly to neighboring Shenzhen, which became the first Special Economic Zone of China in 1978, the implementation of Zhuhai as an SEZ was largely due to its strategic position adjacent to Macau, a capitalist trading center similar to Shenzhen's position with Hong Kong.

The establishment of Zhuhai as an SEZ allowed the Chinese Central Government and economy to have easier access to the Macau and consequently, global market. As a result, Zhuhai is now a major city in the Pearl River Delta region according to the new general urban plan approved by the State Council. The implementation of Special Economy Zone intended for the city to become a key port city, science and education city, scenic and tourism city, and as a regional hub for transportation.

The outstanding geographic location, a wide range of supporting infrastructure and a deep-water port serve as a major attraction for foreign capital. Utilized foreign investment reached US$10.344 billion in 2008. Among the top 500 enterprises worldwide, 19 of them have investment projects in Zhuhai such as ExxonMobil, BP, Siemens, Carrefour and Matsushita.

Manufacturing industries 

Industrial development in Zhuhai focuses on five new high-tech and heavy industries including electronics, computer software, biotechnology and pharmacy, machinery and equipment as well as petrochemical industries. Aiming to strengthen the existing industrial base as well as to provide a better environment for the development of new high-tech industries, the local government has taken the initiative in developing five economic zones:

 Zhuhai High-Tech Industrial Development Zone
As one of the four earliest Special Economic Zones (SEZs) in China, Zhuhai SEZ was set up in the year 1980 and granted with a local legislative right. Zhuhai hi-tech zone is located in the north of Zhuhai, which is very close to downtown. Furthermore, technological resources are centralized in our zone; there is also a huge development in hi-tech industries led by the software and IC industries. The hi-tech zone is the showcase for Zhuhai's scientific development. Meizu is one high tech product headquartered in Zhuhai.
 Zhuhai Free Trade Zone
Zhuhai Free Trade Zone (Zhuhai FTZ) was founded in 1996 with the State Council's approval, occupying . A Zhuhai FTZ Administrative Committee was set up in June 1997. By the end of 2006, there had been over 200 companies registered in the Free Trade Zone, including more than 150 foreign-funded enterprises, and the total investment amount was one billion US dollars. Industries encouraged in the zone include electronics assembly & manufacturing, telecommunications equipment, building/construction materials, instruments & industrial equipment production, medical equipment and supplies, raw material processing, research & development, shipping/warehousing/logistics, and heavy industry.

 Harbour industrial zone (provincial level)
 Wanshan ocean development testing zone (provincial level)

The Wanshan archipelago is located in one of the major fishing areas of China and is core to the Wanshan ocean development testing zone. However, Perna viridis, a species of green mussel, was found to be contaminated by HCHs, DDTs, and PCBs.

 Hengqin economic development zone (provincial level)
 Global printer consumables manufacturing centre

Zhuhai manufactured and supplied 70% of the world's ribbons, 60% of the world's aftermarket inkjet cartridges and 20% of the world's third-party laser toner cartridges. Their combined sales were worth more than 1.3 billion US dollars or 10% of all the sales in the world. Zhuhai owns a comprehensive supply chain and almost any of the raw materials needed by the printer consumables industry can be provided locally.

Administration 

The prefecture-level city of Zhuhai administers three county-level divisions and four special economic districts, all of which are districts.

Transportation

Airports 
 Zhuhai Jinwan Airport , formerly Zhuhai Sanzao Airport,  an international airport connecting all provincial cities in Mainland China (except Xining and Lhasa) and many other major cities, hosting an annual air show and an exhibition hall, with Chinese space rockets located in Jinwan District.
 , verbally "Jiuzhou Heliport") , is located in Xiangzhou district, near the Jiuzhou harbour, and has short plane runway and a helipad. Its place inside Jiuzhou inner district, permits quick transport of injured people from surrounding islands to the city hospitals. China Southern Airlines offer sightseeing flights and charters to drilling stations in South China Sea using Sikorsky S-76 helicopters via this airport as well. They used to fly to Guangzhou Baiyun Airport from this airport using Cessna C208 Caravan as well, but the route was discontinued.
Zhuhai also is served by airports outside:
 Macau International Airport , which is closer to the city of Zhuhai proper, than Zhuhai Jinwan Airport itself, has an "Express Link" service in which transiting passengers who go through Gongbei Port of Entry/Posto Fronteiriço das Portas do Cerco are not processed through Macau customs; passengers may also have their baggage taken from Macau Airport to Lotus Bridge in Hengqin Island.
 Hong Kong International Airport ; ticketed passengers can take ferries from the Zhuhai Ferry Terminal to the HKIA Skypier. Since its inauguration in September 2018, Zhuhai residents can reach HKG via Hong Kong-Zhuhai-Macau Bridge.

Zhuhai residents may also use Shenzhen Bao'an International Airport  and travel there by bus or ferry.

Railway 

Zhuhai Railway Station is located at the western end of Gongbei Port of Entry and Portas do Cerco at the border of Zhuhai and Macau. There are frequent high speed trains to Guangzhou, Guilin, Beijing, Shanghai, Chengdu and other main cities in China. The intercity railway between Zhuhai Gongbei and Zhuhai Jinwan International Airport is under construction. It is expected to be opened to Hengqin in November 2019, and the whole project will be completed in 2024. It will take only 30 minutes to commute from urban district to the airport using the completed line.

Zhuhai also has a tram network, with the first phase of Line 1 completed in 2014. In 2017, Line 1 began service to the public. The trams ceased running in January 2021 due to frequent power issues and low patronage.

The Zhuhai Metro is currently in the planning stage. Line 1 will start from Jiuzhou Port and end at the Jinwan Station, with a total length of 36.8 km; Line 2 will start from Jinding Industrial Area and end at Gongbei Port, with a total length of 30.5 km. Construction was expected to start in 2019, with an estimated time of completion in 2024.

Sea 

Zhuhai is known for its good climate and good air quality. Endowed with a long coastline, it is the only city on the western Pearl River Delta with natural deep-water ports.

Zhuhai has two international seaports: Jiuzhou and Gaolan. Gaolan Port is one of the leading ports in Guangdong province, while Jiuzhou Port focuses on heavy passenger sea transport.

Chu Kong Passenger Transport operates a ferry service between Zhuhai's Jiuzhou Port, Hong Kong and Shekou Passenger Terminal, in the Nanshan District of Shenzhen. A service between Jiuzhou Port and Hong Kong International Airport for air passengers using the airport began on 10 July 2007.

Road 

Zhuhai is currently served by two major Chinese national expressways:

 G94 Pearl River Delta Ring Expressway
 The G94 Pearl River Delta Ring Expressway, which will form a beltway surrounding the Guangzhou metropolitan area when completed, currently connects Zhuhai to the Sanshui District of Foshan. In 2018 the Hong Kong-Zhuhai-Macau Bridge opened, reducing the travel time by road from Zhuhai to Hong Kong in approximately 40 minutes. G94 was extended to follow this bridge, with sections currently under construction connecting the bridge to the Zhuhai-Foshan section.

 G0425 Guangzhou–Macau Expressway
 A spur route of the mainline G4 Beijing–Hong Kong and Macau Expressway, G0425 directly links Guangzhou to Zhuhai (and thus, Macau). It has a concurrency with G94 for several kilometers. Heavy traffic between Zhuhai and Macau has led to the construction of a new cross-border corridor, the Lotus Bridge, built in November 1999 to divert traffic away from the congested Gongbei Port of Entry (Portas do Cerco). G0425 currently ends in Zhuhai at Zhuhai Avenue, pending an extension to the Lotus Bridge via Hengqin island.

Tourism 

Zhuhai and the surrounding landscapes have a reputation within China of being a garden city with a high quality of life.  In 2002, the city attracted 1.3 million international tourists and 3.64 million domestic tourists. Following Guangzhou and Shenzhen, Zhuhai has the third largest amount of foreign tourism in the Guangdong province.

Zhuhai hosts the China International Aviation & Aerospace Exhibition biannually in November. It is the largest Air Show in China and a huge tourist attraction.

Realizing the benefits brought by tourism, the local government is expanding tourist destinations and is developing new spots such as Hengqin, Dong'ao, Hebao, Qi'ao and Yeli.

New Yuan Ming Palace 

It features a partial reconstruction of the Old Summer Palace in Beijing which was destroyed during the Second Opium War and was never rebuilt on its original site.

Coast of Xianglu Bay—Fisher Girl Statue 

The coast of Xianglu Bay is considered the "symbol" of Zhuhai, offering a scenic view of Pearl River Delta with silt-rich water, rocks, and a beach. The famous landmark of the city, the Fisher Girl Statue, stands elegantly on a boulder in Xianglu Bay; the statue is draped by a fishnet and holds a pearl high in the air with both hands up to the sky, symbolizing a vigorous and lively Zhuhai welcoming visitors from all over the world. It was erected in 1982 by a professor from the Guangzhou Academy of Fine Arts and is 8.7 meters tall, composed of 70 pieces of granite. Visitors can view the statue up close from a boardwalk on the shore.

The statue was based on a local legend, in which the daughter of the celestial Dragon King visited the Pearl River delta. Enamored by the beauty of the Zhuhai region, she disguised herself as a fisher girl and lived among the people there, weaving baskets and healing locals with her powers until she fell in love with a fellow fisherman named Haipeng. The romance between Haipeng and the fisher girl was interrupted by vicious rumors among the people about the latter's true origins. Haipeng eventually confronted the fisher girl about this and demanded she give her magical pearl bracelets to him as proof of her love. She confirmed the rumors and explained that if she removed even one of the pearls, she would die. As Haipeng refused to believe her story and turned to leave, the fisher girl took off her bracelets, dying in Haipeng's arms. Heartbroken and guilt-ridden, Haipeng set out to find a cure, eventually discovering from a local elder that he would need to cultivate a special grass with his own blood. After years of toiling, Haipeng finally harvested enough to revive the fisher girl, turning her into a mortal. The two later married and the fisher girl found a large pearl, which she gifted to the elder in gratitude on the day of the wedding.

Education

Strategic development 

Developing a university park is part of Zhuhai's strategy to strengthen its high-tech and IT industries. Compared with Beijing and Shanghai, Zhuhai and other cities in Guangdong province face a serious shortage of talent and professionals.

Colleges and universities 

 Zhuhai Campus of Jinan University
 Beijing Normal University, Zhuhai Campus
 Beijing Institute of Technology, Zhuhai Campus
 Sun Yat-Sen University, Zhuhai Campus
 Zhuhai College of Jilin University
University of Macau (under the jurisdiction of Macau SAR government)
 United International College
 Zhuhai Radio & TV University

A number of other colleges and universities are also located in or near Zhuhai. Beijing Normal University Zhuhai Campus was created as a new model university. Besides its high quality of education, it is more internationally oriented than many universities in China. Many students here prepare to go abroad to finish their junior and senior years.

Primary and secondary education 

Despite the shortage of higher education, Zhuhai government has been paying a lot of attention to primary and secondary education. From 2007, high school students in Zhuhai needn't pay school fees anymore.

As a result, there are many famous high schools in Zhuhai. Zhuhai No.1 High School (ZH1Z) is one of the most competitive high schools in Guangdong Province, and also a member of the Guangdong "Six Schools Union".

Dulwich International High School Zhuhai, QSI International School of Zhuhai, and Zhuhai International School serve expatriates and/or use foreign educational systems.

Supplementary schools 
 is a supplementary school for overseas Japanese in Zhuhai. It holds classes at QSI School.

Sports facilities 

Zhuhai is the first city in China to have constructed a motor racing circuit. The Zhuhai International Circuit was built in 1996 and is located at Jinding, near the border to Zhongshan. ZIC has held the BPR Global GT Endurance Series in 1996, the FIA GT Championship in 1997, 1999, 2004 and 2005. It hosted the championship's 2007 opening round on 24 and 25 March. ZIC had planned to host a round of the Champ Car World Series on 20 May 2007, but agreement was not reached. ZIC held an A1GP race in 2007 for the first time in series' history. ZIC became the first venue in China to host the Intercontinental Le Mans Cup on 7 November 2010 when the 2010 1000 km of Zhuhai was staged.

Zhuhai has also a new tennis center which hosts WTA Elite Trophy, the last tournament of the year for players that are in the top 20 but did not qualify to WTA Finals.

Notable people

Notable people 

 Rong Hong (1828–1912), first Chinese student to graduate from a western university
 Huang Kuan (1828–1878), first Chinese person to study in Europe
 Tang Tingshu (1832–1892), general manager of China Merchants' Steam Navigation Company
 Tang Shaoyi (1862–1938), first Premier of the Republic of China
 Su Zhaozheng (1885–1929), early phase leader of the Communist Party of China
  (1887–1927), leader of labour movement, member of the Communist Party of China
  (1896–1931), early phase leader of the Communist Party of China
 Rong Guotuan (1937–1968), first Chinese table tennis player to the world championship
 Dong Mingzhu (1954–), chairperson of Gree Electric
 Zhang Lianwei (1965–), Chinese professional golfer
 Yi Siling (1989–), Chinese Sport shooter, Champion of Women's 10 metre air rifle at London 2012 Olympics
 Hon Chio Leong (2001–), Macanese racing driver and 2-time Macau Grand Prix champion

Mayors and CPC Committee Secretaries

Mayors

CPC Committee Secretaries

Sister cities 

See Sister cities of Zhuhai

See also 
 Hengqin, an offshore island administered by Zhuhai
 Wanshan Qundao, 104 island archipelago in the South China Sea

Notes

References

External links 

Official government website (available in Chinese and English)
Website of Hengqin New Area (available in English, Japanese, Portuguese and Spanish)
Massive explosion at hotel in Zuhai, Guangdong, China 🇨🇳 September 11 2020 珠海 爆炸 旅馆

 
Prefecture-level divisions of Guangdong